In the 2001 DFS Classic women's tennis tournament, Lisa Raymond was the defending singles champion, but was defeated in the semifinals by Nathalie Tauziat.

Tauziat went on to win the title, defeating Miriam Oremans in the final 6–3, 7–5.

Seeds
A champion seed is indicated in bold text while text in italics indicates the round in which that seed was eliminated. The top eight seeds received a bye to the second round.

Draw

Finals

Top half

Section 1

Section 2

Bottom half

Section 3

Section 4

References
2001 DFS Classic Draw

DFS Classic Singles
Singles